The 1988 Schleswig-Holstein state election was held on 8 May 1988 to elect the members of the Landtag of Schleswig-Holstein. The snap election was called due to the political stalemate that had occurred in the previous state election of 13 September 1987 and also because of the Barschel affair.

Results

References 

Elections in Schleswig-Holstein
1988 elections in Germany
May 1988 events in Europe